Satellite Business Systems (SBS) was a company founded by IBM, Aetna, COMSAT (and later wholly purchased by IBM and then subsequently sold to MCI), that provided private professional satellite communications through its SBS fleet of FSS geosynchronous satellites, and was the first company to do so.

SBS was founded on December 15, 1975 by the aforementioned companies with the goal of providing a digital satellite communications network for business and other professional clients.

History

In late 1970, MCI Communications created a subsidiary company named MCI Satellite, Inc. The idea was that satellites could provide 'long distance' service from anywhere to anywhere without having to build thousands of miles of terrestrial network facilities. In early 1971, MCI and Lockheed Missiles and Space Company created a joint venture named MCI Lockheed Satellite Corp. which was the first company to request FCC authorization as a Specialized Common Carrier using satellite based communications. A year later, MCI and Lockheed sought an additional source of funding and Comsat Corp. entered the venture which was renamed CML Satellite Corp. In need of cash, MCI sold its share of the venture to IBM Corporation in 1974 (Lockheed also subsequently sold its share to IBM).

IBM owned one third of the company by 1975. It and Comsat brought in Aetna Insurance Company as a third partner and renamed the company Satellite Business Systems (SBS).

Marketing

The original concept was for a large corporation to install SBS earth stations at each of its major sites. This strategy limited SBS' addressable market to corporations with enough concentrated voice and data traffic to justify the installation of multiple earth stations. Earth stations were generally not shared by SBS customers.

Although the SBS technology provided switched digital, leased digital, switched analog, and leased analog connections between a customer's earth stations, most customers used it mainly for intra-corporate voice calls. Data communications protocols of the period were not efficient over satellite links.

One SBS customer, ISACOMM, extended the business model to smaller corporate customers and provided offnet connectivity as well.

The high initial costs of deploying earth stations, along with the rapid success and expansion of terrestrial competitors like MCI and Sprint, prevented SBS from attaining its commercial targets. Excess transponders on SBS satellites were leased to other companies, and SBS adopted some of ISACOMM's marketing tactics and even pursued the consumer long-distance market on a limited basis.

Technology

SBS' fleet of satellites were the first in orbit to offer transponders in the Ku band, meaning that smaller, less expensive dishes and equipment could be used to receive and transmit to the satellites, making SBS' satellite system attractive for business customers.  This was opposed to then-current satellites using the C band of RF spectrum, requiring a larger (and more costly) dish 8 feet (and up) in size. However, Ku signals suffered more from rain fade.

The SBS earth station was designed by IBM. It consisted of a highly modified IBM 1800 and a TDMA modem. All earth stations were managed from the SBS central network operations facility located in McLean, VA, which was also the headquarters location for the corporation.

Historical Note

 The first use of the NASA Shuttle for commercial purposes was the deployment of the SBS 3 satellite in November, 1982 from STS-5.  SBS engineers designed the cradle that sat in the cargo bay of the shuttle and spun up to 50 RPM, then ejected the spinning satellite with the use of explosive bolts.

SBS satellites in orbit

Through its existence as a company, SBS had six satellites in orbit:

SBS 1-5 were built by Hughes using the HS-376 platform.  SBS-6 used the HS-393 platform.

SBS 1-6 are no longer in service and have been placed in graveyard orbits.  SBS-6 was the last SBS satellite in operation at 74 degrees west longitude.  It was decommissioned in July 2007 and replaced by Intelsat Galaxy 17.

The end of SBS

In July 1984, Comsat left SBS, and exactly a year later, Satellite Business Systems was sold to MCI. MCI migrated the voice and data traffic of most SBS customers to its terrestrial network. During the sale of SBS to MCI, four satellites (SBS 1-4) were then in orbit.

In 1987, SBS' fleet was sold off. SBS 1 and 2 were sold to Comsat, SBS 3 remained with MCI, and SBS 4 was sold to IBM's Satellite Transponder Leasing Corporation (STLC) together with the SBS 5 and 6 satellites, which were then still on the ground.

In April 1990, Hughes Communications Inc (HCI), a subsidiary of Hughes Aircraft (who built the satellites) bought STLC from IBM. Sometime later (possibly around 1992) SBS 3 was sold to Comsat. Comsat was later bought by Lockheed Martin.

Due to the divestiture of its fleet (to MCI & HCI, and to Comsat and IBM as well, the former founders of SBS), SBS no longer exists as an entity, with the last satellite left of its fleet, SBS 6, being decommissioned in July 2007 and last being owned by Intelsat.

References

External links
List of feeds on SBS 6 from lyngsat.com

Defunct telecommunications companies of the United States
Communications satellite operators
Derelict satellites orbiting Earth
Telecommunications companies established in 1975
American companies established in 1975
Companies based in McLean, Virginia
Aerospace companies of the United States
Defunct technology companies of the United States
Space technology